Oyeshola “Shola” Olatoye (o-LAH-twoh-yay) (born 1975) was the 22nd Chair and Chief Executive Officer of the New York City Housing Authority (NYCHA) before resigning due to a lead paint poisoning and lack of heat scandals.

Early life and education 
Oyeshola Olatoye grew up Waterbury, Connecticut. Her father is Nigerian.

Olatoye graduated with a Bachelors of Arts in history and African American studies from Wesleyan University in 1996 and later earned a master's degree in public administration from the Robert F. Wagner Graduate School of Public Service at New York University (NYU).

Career 
In 2001, Olatoye worked for Public Advocate Mark Green's 2001 mayoral bid as the issues director.

In 2009, she joined Enterprise Community Partners where she became the vice president and market leader for the New York office prior to being named chair and CEO of NYCHA. At Enterprise, she led a team of roughly 50 employees to build and preserve 3,000 units of affordable housing in the New York area. She also helped secure over $30 million in federal recovery dollars for 11,000 residents impacted by Hurricane Sandy.

New York City Housing Authority 
In 2014, Olatoye was appointed by Mayor de Blasio as the chair and Chief Executive Officer of the New York City Housing Authority (NYCHA). As chair and CEO she developed a 10-year turnaround plan called NextGeneration NYCHA (NextGen) and balanced the $3.1 billion operating budget for three years through help from the federal government upping its aid to the agency, hiking rents, removing community and senior centers from its property list, and not being charged for police services. During her tenure, she announced the plan to lease public housing land to private developers to build roughly 500 apartments for low-income tenants.

Failure to inspect NYCHA properties of lead paint had begun during the Bloomberg administration in 2012, but Olatoye signed off on paperwork stating the agency's compliance of inspection and neither she nor top officials alerted the public or tenants until after they had remediated apartments. In 2015, NYCHA officials and the Department of Investigation (DOI) knew they were not in compliance with city law to inspect apartments for lead paint but denied any wrongdoing to federal prosecutors.  Later that year, the office of the United States attorney for the Southern District of New York requested the agency to send documentation relating to lead paint. On March 28, 2016, Olatoye testified before the City Council that the agency was in compliance. Her testimony was quickly cited as false. The de Blasio administration denied any wrongdoing on the part of Olatoye or NYCHA. In April 2018, she resigned from her position after mishandling of lead paint inspections and poor living conditions at NYCHA.

In 2018, she joined building contractor Suffolk as vice president in charge of business development in New York.

Awards 
In 2014, she was listed on Crain's list of “40 under 40” of New York's “most talented, driven, and dynamic” young professionals.

In 2017, she received the Elizabeth B. Wells Memorial Award by the National Association of Housing and Redevelopment Officials (NAHRO), the Coalition for Queens public service award, Wesleyan University Distinguished Alumni Award, Urban Upbound, and Green City Force.

References 

New York City public officials
1975 births
Living people